251 km is a rural locality (a settlement) in Tarabarinskoye Rural Settlement of Promyshlennovsky District, Russia. The  population was 8 as of 2010.

Streets 
There is no streets with titles.

Geography 
251 km is located 18 km west of Promyshlennaya (the district's administrative centre) by road.

References 

Rural localities in Kemerovo Oblast